New Denver is at the mouth of Carpenter Creek, on the east shore of Slocan Lake, in the West Kootenay region of southeastern British Columbia.

Name origin
In 1892, the town was mostly called Slocan City or Slocan for about a month, Eldorado City or Eldorado for about seven months, and New Denver since. However, these names were used interchangeably for months. Furthermore, the place may have been known as Carpenter Creek townsite after its founding in 1891. 

Appearing about the same time as the Slocan community at the foot of the lake, it is unclear why the latter prevailed in keeping the name. Until the government survey in mid 1892, the place was a squatters camp for miners. Named for El Dorado, the legendary city of gold, the surrounding mines were hoped to bring comparable prosperity. On discovering the mines were silver deposits, the name changed to reflect the famed silver mines of Denver, Colorado.

History 
New Denver was an early service center for mines and the nearby mining towns. A landing on the lake, the stage ran every two days to Nakusp, and four days to Nelson. In 1895, Denver Canyon became a stop on the former Nakusp and Slocan Railway. The settlement was incorporated as a village in 1929. After the decline in mining, forestry became the economic base, and tourism in more recent times.

Japanese internment during World War II 
One of the nine West Kootenay internment centres for Japanese Canadians during World War II, following their removal from the BC Coast, by 1942, the camp held 1,505 Japanese Canadians, who built 275 shacks in a fruit grove known as the "Orchard." Other internment centres in the Slocan region were nearby at Slocan City, Lemon Creek, Rosebery, Kaslo and Sandon.

New Denver's Nikkei Internment Memorial Centre is dedicated to the history of the 27,000 interned Japanese Canadians, and is a National Historic Site.

Doukhobor residential school 
For decades Freedomites refused to send their Doukhobor children to school. After multiple warnings, the government forcibly removed such children from their families. Operating 1953–1959, about 170 children, aged 7–15, passed through the New Denver facility but attended the public school. Although parents were allowed twice-monthly visits, most chose instead to speak to their children through the wire fence.

Zincton resort controversy 
In May 2020, New Denver resident David Harley, owner of Valhalla Pure Outfitters, proposed building a 55-acre "world-class, all-season, backcountry-oriented" resort called Zincton between New Denver and Kaslo.  Those promoting Zincton claim the resort will create jobs and do much to remedy economic and social decline in the area. 
The proposed site is in a critical wildlife corridor connecting Goat Range and Kokanee Provincial Parks and is also prime grizzly bear habitat; opponents fear the resort's negative ecological impact.  Of the 3000 emailed comments received by British Columbia's Ministry of Forests, Lands, Natural Resource Operations and Rural Development regarding Zincton, 2300 opposed building the resort.

Demographics 

Communications
The town is notable for its resistance to mobile phones. In a 2008 referendum, many citizens voted against the introduction of cellular telephone service. Despite this, on 20 July 2010, Telus Canada began installation of a cell phone facility in the heart of the village with many citizens peacefully protesting the installation.

Climate

Flora and fauna

2019 saw a drastic increase in New Denver's native roof rat population. The Norwegian rat was introduced to the area the same year and is thought to have arrived by transport truck from other regions.  Council members blamed the infestation on local gardening and composting practices.

Notable people 

 Aubrey Nealon (born 1971), film and television director, producer and writer

References

External links

Doukhobors
Mining communities in British Columbia
Populated places in the Slocan
Villages in British Columbia
World War II internment camps in Canada